Yenaktayevo (Yanaqtay; , Čormak) is a rural locality (a village) in Kariyevsky Selsoviet, Krasnokamsky District, Bashkortostan, Russia. The population was 96 as of 2010. There are 4 streets.

Geography 
Yenaktayevo is located 26 km southeast of Nikolo-Beryozovka (the district's administrative centre) by road. Kariyevo is the nearest rural locality.

References 

Rural localities in Krasnokamsky District